Al-Adhbah (also spelled as Al Athbah) is a village in Qatar, located in the municipality of Ash Shamal. It previously served as Bedouin camping ground and had 5 masonry wells in the early 1900s.

Etymology
Al Adhbah translates to 'sweet' in English. It was given this name because its fresh water was of good quality, with little salinity.

Geography
In previous times, the main villages situated directly on the coast such as Al Ghariyah and Fuwayrit often experienced water shortages because saltwater intrusion restricted direct access to the groundwater. Furthermore, the water that could be obtained was highly saline. As a result, Al Adhbah would establish a trade relationship with these villages in which it would receive maritime goods such as fish and pearls in exchange for its potable water.

References

Al Shamal